The Miguel de Cervantes Prize is awarded annually to honour the lifetime achievement of an outstanding writer in the Spanish language.

History
The prize was established in 1975 by the Ministry of Culture of Spain and first awarded the following year. The Encyclopædia Britannica calls it "most prestigious and remunerative award given for Spanish-language literature". The winner receives a monetary award of 125,000 euros, which makes it one of the richest literary prizes in the world. The prize rewards authors from any Spanish-speaking nation and recognizes the recipient's overall body of work. Of the forty-seven prizes awarded in the history of the Cervantes Prize, only six have ever been awarded to women. In 1988, the Spanish writer María Zambrano (1904-1991) was the first to writer to be so honored. The award is named after Miguel de Cervantes, author of Don Quixote. The candidates are proposed by the Association of Spanish Language Academies (i.e., the Royal Spanish Academy).

As of the presentation of the 2019 award to Joan Margarit, the recipients have been recognized for their writing of novels, poetry, short stories, essays, translations, philosophy or dramasor for combinations thereof. With two winners in 1979, there have been 45 recipients of the Miguel de Cervantes Prize.

The Cervantes Prize and the Nobel Prize in Literature
Three of the 45 winners of the Miguel de Cervantes Prize have also won the Nobel Prize in Literature. Octavio Paz (Cervantes 1981, Nobel 1990) and Mario Vargas Llosa (Cervantes 1994, Nobel 2010), were awarded the Nobel Prize in subsequent years, while Camilo José Cela received the Nobel Prize in 1989 and was awarded the Cervantes Prize in 1995.

Laureates
The list of winners is available at the official Premio 'Miguel Cervantes''' website.

 Laureates per country 
The following table shows the number of laureates per country:

Notes and references

External links
 Miguel de Cervantes Prize at the Ministry of Culture
 Miguel de Cervantes Prize El poder de la palabra'' 

Awards established in 1976
Literary awards honoring lifetime achievement
Miguel de Cervantes
Spanish-language literary awards
Spanish literary awards
1976 establishments in Spain